Society Hill Towers is a three-building condominium located in the Society Hill neighborhood of Philadelphia, Pennsylvania.  The complex contains three 31-story skyscrapers with 624 units on a  site.  The towers were designed by I.M. Pei and Associates and are constructed of poured-in-place concrete, with each apartment featuring floor-to-ceiling windows. Completed in 1964, the apartments were originally rental units but were converted to condominiums in 1979.

History
In the late 1950s, Society Hill was considered a slum neighborhood, which was targeted for redevelopment by the Philadelphia City Planning Commission and the Redevelopment Authority. From 1957 to 1959, the Greater Philadelphia Movement, the Redevelopment Authority, and the Old Philadelphia Development Corporation bought  around Dock Street. They relocated and demolished the Dock Street Market, setting aside  of land that would become the Society Hill Towers. In 1957, Edmund Bacon, the executive director of the Philadelphia City Planning Commission, awarded developer-architect firm Webb and Knapp the competition for the redevelopment of Society Hill. Architect I. M. Pei and his team created a plan for three 31-story Society Hill Towers as well as the Society Hill Townhouses, a low-rise project. The Towers and Townhouses project was completed in 1964, while the entire plan was completed in 1977.

The buildings were listed on the Philadelphia Register of Historic Places on March 10, 1999.

See also

References
Notes

External links

 Society Hill Towers
 Listing and photographs at Philadelphia Architects and Buildings

Residential skyscrapers in Philadelphia
Residential condominiums in the United States
Residential buildings completed in 1963
Society Hill, Philadelphia
Multi-building developments in Philadelphia
I. M. Pei buildings